Clifford Chase is an American novelist who has written  The Tooth Fairy, a memoir, Winkie, a novel about a sentient teddy bear accused of terrorism, The Hurry-Up Song: A Memoir of Losing My Brother (Living Out), and who was the editor of Queer 13: Lesbian and Gay Writers Recall Seventh Grade, a shortlisted nominee in the Children's/Young Adult and Nonfiction Anthologies categories at the 1999 Lambda Literary Awards.

Chase is currently a visiting writer at Bowling Green University, where he instructs courses in creative writing for the English Department. This year he is teaching Techniques of Nonfiction, Advanced Nonfiction Workshop, and Spec. Topics in Creative Writing. He was previously a Vising Writer and professor of English at Wesleyan University.

External links
 Official author site, per Grove Press
 Radio Interview on Bookworm, National Public Radio
 Wesleyan Faculty Listing

American male novelists
21st-century American novelists
Year of birth missing (living people)
Living people
Wesleyan University faculty
21st-century American memoirists
American gay writers
American LGBT novelists
21st-century American male writers
Novelists from Connecticut
American male non-fiction writers
21st-century American LGBT people